Antonio Rosario (born July 27, 1989), better known as Orikal Uno, is an American rapper from Saint Paul, Minnesota.Orikal Uno is known as a visual artist; painting custom canvases for people via multiple platforms on the internet. He is also a notable music producer and audio engineer.

Early life and education
Orikal Uno was born Antonio Lorenzo Rosario in Saint Paul, Minnesota, on July 27, 1989. He is of Puerto Rican, European and Native-American descent. He graduated from St. Paul Open School in 2006. He has had a noticeable vocal conversational stutter since his early childhood. Although it is less prominent, it is still noticeable in conversation. He has quoted hip-hop and freestyle rapping as a way to finally be able to "speak fluently and clearly" as he can rap at a rapid-fire pace without a single hiccup or stutter.

Career 
Before establishing himself as a musician, Rosario spent time studying the art and science of graffiti. Often the outcast among the local crews in the Twin Cities, he was forced to go out on his own and learn the ropes from the ground up. It was around this time that his love for hip-hop music led to Rosario starting to write rap songs with friends and on his own. Scraping up any sort of equipment he could, he had a makeshift recording setup that was responsible for 2 full-length releases (Under the name of Orikal), Unquestionable (2003) and Visions of Elevation (2004). These records were primarily produced by a producer he met on a Sage Francis internet forum by the name of Hiphopapotamus.

Due to differences between the two, Hiphopapotamus and Orikal parted ways. Being left without beats, Orikal taught himself how to make instrumentals, starting out on Fruityloops and eventually landing on his current go-to program, Reason. He would go on to produce two more full-length albums: The Harsh Reality (2006) and Now What?! (2007) under the name "Orikal"

Orikal founded Graff Roots Media in 2006 as a platform to release his own music and art. This has operated as his label and is still actively going today. The goal of the organization is to be able to do everything music, art and marketing related in-house.

In 2008, Orikal decided to add "Uno" to his professional name. Partly as homage to his roots in graffiti, partly to reflect his Puerto Rican heritage, and partly to solidify a brand of his own without confusion. It was also this year that he was diagnosed with Type-1 Diabetes and has been insulin-dependent ever since. At the end of the year, he traveled out to Los Angeles where he worked for Ron Sobel at North Star Media.

It was around this time that Orikal started working with notable musician Maria Isa. They recorded various music, and digitally released a compilation of unheard music "Then and Now" in 2011.

In 2011, Orikal successfully launched a Kickstarter campaign with a target of $1500 to release his first official album as Orikal Uno, simply titled "Uno" and produced by long-time friend and frequent collaborator Anonimust. Backers were rewarded with an autographed copy of the album as well as personalized stickers painted by Orikal.

In 2012, Sab the Artist and Abstract Rude released The Awful Truth via Rhymesayers Entertainment in which Orikal Uno produced the title song.

Orikal also released his full-length album "It Is What It Is" which was produced by frequent collaborator Chris Goodwin. This record also featured appearances by DisputeOne and Ganzobean

Chris Goodwin and Orikal would then go on to release "Whatever Happens, Happens" in 2013. A darker album in comparison to "It Is What It Is," this album featured notable appearances by Twin Cities emcees Kristoff Krane and Freez (of Illuminous 3)

In 2014, DisputeOne introduced Orikal to producer Serebe, who is most notably the producer behind Eyedea's song Perfect Medicine - The duo linked up and released the full-length album "Sleepwalker", which features appearances by Glo Pesci, DisputeOne, Michelle Kearney, NL Emnt and DJ Elsewhere

In 2015, Anonimust and Orikal teamed up once again to release the full-length album "Chasing Paradise", which would go on to score Orikal his first publishing deal.

2015 would see Orikal and DisputeOne get together to create their first full-length album and 12" vinyl record titled "OnePlusOne" - The duo first started working with each other in late 2011, going on to release the mixtape "Homework Volume 1" and delivering notable performances throughout the Twin Cities for the next year, including a sold-out show at the Fineline Music Cafe in which notable rapper Mac Lethal ordered the entire crowd pizza.

As OnePlusOne, they had a busy 2016 with the release of their debut record "1+1". This release is Orikal Uno's first appearance on 12" vinyl, which was self-released through his label Graff Roots Media.

2016 also saw the debut of Orikal Uno and DJ Greenery as spellbound - a project which sees DJ Greenery on production and Orikal Uno on vocals and song arrangement.

2017 saw Orikal Uno release his upcoming self-produced LP "Tone Rosario" - Also notable is that he performed with DJ Greenery as spellbound at a sold out show held at legendary venue First Avenue's 7th St. Entry opening for hip-hop heavyweights Blackalicious in October 2017.

In 2017, Minneapolis—St. Paul arts publication City Pages named Orikal Uno's self-produced single "Knockin" as the lead video of the Top 5 music videos of Minnesota. 2017 also saw the OnePlusOne song "Pelican" produced by Orikal Uno gain radio play on KZGO (GO 95.3 FM).

In January 2018, Orikal Uno released Come Back, the third collaborative effort with DJ Dixon DeVille (f/k/a Jayechs, Anonimust) on production.

Discography

Orikal Uno

Studio albums
Unquestionable (2003) (CD)
Visions of Elevation (2004) (CD)
The Harsh Reality (2006) (CD)
Now What?! (2007) (CD)
Uno (2011) (CD)
It Is What It Is (2012) (Digital)
Whatever Happens, Happens (2013) (Digital)
Sleepwalker (2014) (Digital)
Chasing Paradise (2015) (Digital)
Tone Rosario (2017) (CD, Digital)
Come Back (2018) (Digital, CD)
Vibes Up (2020) (Digital)

EPs
Then and Now (f/ Maria Isa) (2011) (Digital)
Indigo EP (2018) (Digital)
Tonaphide EP (2018) (Digital)
Speech Therapy EP (2019) (Digital)
Vessel EP (2021) (Digital)
Love Luck EP (2021) (Digital)

Mixtapes
Organized Grind Volume 1 (2009) (Digital)
Organized Grind Volume 2 (blended by DJ Elsewhere) (2013) (Digital)
Organized Grind Volume 3 (2018) (Digital)

OnePlusOne
Homework Volume 1 (2012) (Digital)
1+1 (2016) (Vinyl, CD)

spellbound
Rich with Ambition (2016) (Digital)
Holy Acrimony (2022) (Digital, Cassette)

Personal life 
Uno is currently located in South Minneapolis and is said to be inspired by watching over Lake Street.

Sources

 https://voyageminnesota.com/interview/daily-inspiration-meet-orikal-uno/
 https://first-avenue.com/performer/oneplusone/
 http://www.citypages.com/music/orikal-uno-knocks-around-lake-street-in-this-weeks-top-5-mn-music-videos/436403993
 http://rhymesayers.com/news/abstract_rude_and_sab_the_artist_musab_releasing_the_awful_truth_on_nov_23rd
 http://thefreshcommittee.com/2017/07/stream-orikal-uno-knockin/
 https://www.laonlock.com/videos/7/20/2017/orikal-uno-knockin-video
 https://www.discogs.com/artist/5200485-Orikal
 https://www.thankyourob.com/podcast/episode-112-featuring-orikal-uno/
 https://gurlgiltmusic.com/spellbounds-rich-with-ambition-rich-with-skill-61fe9f489769
 http://tchiphop.com/news/2011/orikal-uno-maria-isa-mixtape/
 http://noteamini.blogspot.com/2010/05/introducingorikal-please-say-uno.html
 https://medium.com/@dominos197822/this-lyrical-genius-who-spits-a-fast-game-and-has-an-art-for-making-a-song-high-energy-e45b071f78df
 http://abovegroundmagazine.com/the-leak/09/20/orikal-uno-party-like-its-2012/
 http://midwestbroadcast.blogspot.com/2010/04/orikal-uno-lonesome-road.html
 http://www.themadbloggers.com/2010/08/check-it-orikal-uno-prof-rev-it-up.html
 http://hiphopspy.com/orikal-uno-lonesome-road
 http://kymnradio.net/2010/04/24/keymn-radio-god/
 http://tccuts.blogspot.com/2010/03/orikal-uno.html
 http://rockboxblog.wordpress.com/tag/orikal-uno/
 http://www.catiblog.com/?p=2948
 http://uglegends.wordpress.com/2011/02/01/ammo/
 http://survivingthegoldenage.com/new-orikal-featuring-ganzobean-me-my-dj/
 http://mindcapacitiinquiry.blogspot.com/2011/01/orikal-uno-day_26.html
 http://www.ssgmusic.com/also-tonight-abstract-rude/
 http://lokalcelebrities.blogspot.com/2009/09/lokal-celebrities-radio-episode-14-ft.html
 http://hangout.altsounds.com/news/122069-orikal-uno-party-2012-a.html
 http://www.mylifesmuse.com/2010/09/18/orikal-uno-party-like-its-2012/
 http://mplsroscoartistmanagement.wordpress.com/2011/05/13/pheromoan-productions/
 http://first-avenue.com/performer/orikal-uno

External links
 Website
 Soundcloud
 spellbound
 Custom Canvases via Etsy

1989 births
Alternative hip hop musicians
American male rappers
American people of Puerto Rican descent
Living people
Midwest hip hop musicians
Rappers from Minnesota
Songwriters from Minnesota
21st-century American rappers
21st-century American male musicians
American male songwriters